Agent Aika (stylized and known simply as AIKa in Japan) is a Japanese OVA series animated by Studio Fantasia and directed by Katsuhiko Nishijima. The series follows Aika Sumeragi, a salvager for hire who gets caught up in a plot for world domination. The series was released in Japan from 1997 to 1999. The anime was initially licensed by Central Park Media, but was later licensed by Bandai Entertainment. The series is well known for its copious amounts of fan service, specifically the camera angles on panties of the many female characters that populate the show. On April 25, 2007, the first volume of the three-part prequel OVA AIKa R-16: Virgin Mission, detailing Aika's time when she was 16 years old, was released in Japan. A remastered version of the original series was released also, along with a special live-action edition of Agent Aika. In 2009, the sequel OVA AIKa ZERO with 19-year-old Aika was released.

Plot
Following a catastrophic earthquake twenty years prior, Tokyo, along with most of the world, has sunk into the ocean during a large-scale land subsidence. Aika Sumeragi is a salvage agent, a person who digs up submerged artifacts from the cities below. She works for a small company run by Gozo Aida, and takes on fairly dangerous jobs. In the first story, she and Gozo's daughter Rion, search for material called the Lagu. However they are captured by Rudolf Hagen, an effeminate but over-sexed man who wants to use the Lagu to transform the world, destroying its inhabitants, and replacing them with an army of young women called the Delmo Corporation who will carry his progeny. Alongside Rudolf is his obsessive sister Neena Hagen, who is jealous of Aika when Rudolf desires to have Aika for himself. Aika has a special bustier that, when activated, transforms into a battle bikini that gives her extraordinary fighting powers. Following the defeat of the Hagens, the Delmo Corporation girls seek other methods to foil Aika in episodic stories.

Characters

Protagonists
 

 The title character is a 26-year-old salvaging agent with blonde hair and typically a red business dress. The cover of the English video describes her as "sexy, suave, and sophisticated, but she's no bimbo. She's a martial arts expert and a jet fighter pilot with the body of a supermodel. She's Aika, and she's one of the best secret agents in the business." Her parents were scientists and made her a test subject of their experiments until the global earthquakes, after which she is looked after by Gozo Aida, who trains her in art of salvaging.

 

 She is Aika's teenage glasses-wearing partner and the daughter of her boss. She hopes to continue in the family business. She admires Aika, and strives to seek for a big treasure.

 

 Rion's father is the head of a small search and salvage operation called the K.K. Corporation (also known as K2). He was an active industrial spy, but rode on the chance of the catastrophic earthquake and entered the salvaging business. He prefers to hold onto the old ways of offering the best service for the cheapest price.

 

 The son of a company president, he strives to be independent, working as a salvager. He likes Aika a lot and regularly asks her out only to be refused. However, he sometimes ends up in the right place to win the bounty from Aika.

 

 Gusto's partner is a veteran salvager who sports a pink mohawk, and handles the vehicles from tanks to harrier aircraft and spacecraft.

 

 She is a "Class A" secret agent employed by the government to retrieve information on Lagu by infiltrating Hagen's army dressed as a Black Delmo. She even carries her own business cards. She runs into Rion, who ends up following her. After having been abandoned by her employers and her subsequent rescue by Aika and her friends, she went freelance. She reappears in the final episode, where she joins Rion and friends in their assault on the Delmo base. Maypia had red hair. Her iconic outfit is her Black Delmo uniform, which she wears a skintight black dress with white around the collar and a red ribbon, with white thigh-high socks, white panties and black high heels.

 

 Michikusa is introduced in the second story of the original series as a young salvager working under Gozo. Cute-looking but totally air-headed, he sometimes dresses in Delmo staff uniforms when available. He tries to cheer Rion up by role-playing a kappa doll with a squeaky voice, but this usually annoys her and earns him frequent beatings.

Antagonists
Some of them work ordinary jobs like guides and waitresses, but they mainly act in espionage activities. Following Hagen's defeat in the first half of the series, the Delmogeny continue to function with the goals of capturing Aika and studying her special powers. They wear various colored uniforms from lowest-rank black to the highest-rank white, although, for the most part, they wear the same color white panties.

 

 Hagen is the evil mastermind in the first story. He was contracted by the military to find the Lagu, but desires it for his own reasons. He believes that Lagu is something the Earth produced to destroy the humanity that polluted it. He plans to repopulate the Earth with his own progeny which includes his Delmo staff. It is later revealed that Hagen was born as a genetically altered test tube baby, in the process he received superior genes. Because of that he yearns for superior women to impart the genes to his next generation.

 

 Rudolf's sister. She loves her big brother dearly and even sleeps in the nude with him, and dislikes Aika for "seducing" him. A sadistic character with an unstable mood, she walks around in her bare essentials and has the black Delmos punished for failure. She later receives from Rudolf an ultranate panty which allows her to transform to a powered-up form. However, when the device goes out of control, she degenerates into the shape of a blob. She then embraces and engulfs her brother as they are thrown into outer space.

 The  are the infantry class who carry out simple missions.
 The  serve as the officers in the group. Its commander is a beautiful green-haired woman. After Hagen's demise she takes over and seeks revenge on Aika and her entourage. However, after their defeat in the final episode of the original series, she tells the group to stay away from Aika so they can regroup and plan revenge for some future time.
 The  serve on special operations. She uses a retractable sleeve-blade in melee combat and has a hidden flame thrower on her right arm.  is a young operative with long black hair in Operation Silver Wild Grapevine who tries to study Aika and how she fights. She pretends to be the conductor of the physical examination in episode 6, but after her disguise is foiled, she continues to gather Aika's fighting data by sending her underlings against her and then taping the entire battle.
 The  are the elite infantry class. They carry weapons such as the Sturmgewehr 45 assault rifle and perform duties such as piloting or defending the ship against intruders. Its leader has short reddish-brown hair. When Hagen was ending to give directions, she was standing guard with her partner, but she is easily knocked out by the grid that falls on the head, which was kicked by Maypia, after an error of companions, Maypia and Rion end up falling on top of Catherine. Later she was taking care of Rion during her captivity in Rudolph's space ship. However, Rion easily defeated her and took her uniform. She has short wavy blonde hair.
 The  serve as mechanics, engineers and heavy weapons operators aboard the ships and vehicles.

Release
The first four episodes were released from April 25, 1997 to January 25, 1998. The opening theme for the first four episodes was "Silent City", performed by Mari Sasaki, and the closing theme was "More Natural" by Hiroko Konishi. Each episode is numbered as a Trial.

The next three episodes were released from August 25, 1998 to April 25, 1999. The animation was redone to include the new characters such as Michikusa.

Episode list

Reception
In reviewing the first volume, Chris Beveridge on Mania.com wrote that he had to put his brain in a certain mode, likening the experience to watching Dumb and Dumber where "Instead of idiot humor we're watching this for the sheer amount of fanservice." with its "four gajillion panty shots" and that it was a "great deal of mindless fun". He described Michikusa as "a waifish goofy ass boy who serves only one purpose: to be on screen and take time away from panty shots."

Stig Hogset of THEM Anime Reviews wrote that the show should have been a guilty pleasure but ends up being more of an overdose: "EVERY action scene seems to end up with unconscious females lying with their butts poking up into the air." He called the villains the creepiest he has ever seen, but recommended the show only to those with a panty or ass fetish. The Anime News Network reviewer wrote that "It's as if someone tried to make the most perverted anime they could without anyone actually being in any sexual situations. (Okay, so there are some.)", later adding that "The dub is weak and mistimed, and some of the minor characters just plain can't act." and recommended that the viewer watch titles from the company's Anime 18 productions instead. Todd Douglass Jr. of DVD Talk likened Aika's transformation to that in Cutie Honey and called the series the "epitome of guilty pleasure anime". He found the show to be solid-looking with fantastic animation and character design. With regards to the audio, he thought the Japanese cast did a much better job with the material than the English cast, writing that the latter was "particularly bland and it didn't maintain the necessary spark for this kind of show."

References

External links

1997 anime OVAs
Action anime and manga
Anime with original screenplays
Bandai Entertainment anime titles
Central Park Media
Espionage in anime and manga
Post-apocalyptic anime and manga
Seinen manga
Studio Fantasia
Wani Books manga
Wonderful (TV programming block)